Mechanics Hall is a  concert hall in Worcester, Massachusetts. It was built in 1857 in the Renaissance Revival style and restored in 1977.  Built as part of the early nineteenth-century worker's improvement movement, it is now a concert and performing arts venue ranked as one of the top four concert halls in North America and in the top twelve between Europe and the Americas. It also houses a recording studio.

History

Workers in Worcester formed the Mechanics Association in 1842 to help members develop the knowledge and skills to manufacture and run machinery in the mills. In 1857 they built Mechanics Hall to house educational and cultural activities. Mechanics Hall featured a large concert hall on the third floor. Its acoustics enabled audiences to hear speakers' voices and music distinctly without benefit of the as-yet-not-invented  electronic amplifier. A pipe organ was subsequently installed in 1864. Featuring meeting rooms, a library, and two halls, the building became a hub of activity, drawing speakers from Charles Dickens to Susan B. Anthony. The superb acoustics of Mechanics Hall would attract orchestras, bands, and renowned performers from Enrico Caruso to Ella Fitzgerald, Yo Yo Ma to Mel Tormé.

By the mid-20th century, downtown Worcester had declined, and the aging building fell into disfavor as a meeting place. Mechanics Hall was rented out for sporting events such as boxing, wrestling, basketball, and roller-skating. The building continued its decline, and trustees of the dwindling Mechanics Association sought to sell the property. When urban renewal threatened the hall with destruction, the Worcester Heritage Society stepped in. The community rallied around Mechanics Hall once again, raising $5 million for its restoration in 1977. Boston based architecture firm Finegold Alexander + Associates Inc completed the restoration. In reversing the decline of Mechanics Hall, Worcester halted the decline of its downtown, and the city experienced a renaissance.

The Hook Organ
Built in 1864 by E. & G.G. Hook, the Hook Organ is the name for the pipe organ in the Main Hall of Mechanics Hall. It has 52 stops and 3,504 pipes, and is the oldest unaltered four-keyboard organ in the Western Hemisphere. It was restored in 1982.

See also
Mechanics' Hall District
National Register of Historic Places listings in northwestern Worcester, Massachusetts
National Register of Historic Places listings in Worcester County, Massachusetts

References

External links

 Official site
 "Mechanics Hall", at National Park Service
 Mechanics Hall: Symbol of Pride and Industrym, a National Park Service Teaching with Historic Places (TwHP) lesson plan

Clubhouses on the National Register of Historic Places in Massachusetts
Music venues completed in 1857
Buildings and structures in Worcester, Massachusetts
Culture of Worcester, Massachusetts
Concert halls in Massachusetts
Renaissance Revival architecture in Massachusetts
Tourist attractions in Worcester, Massachusetts
National Register of Historic Places in Worcester, Massachusetts
Historic district contributing properties in Massachusetts
1857 establishments in Massachusetts